Spraytech v Hudson, indexed as 114957 Canada Ltée (Spraytech, Société d'arrosage) v. Hudson (Town), [2001] 2 S.C.R. 241; 2001 SCC 40 is a leading Supreme Court of Canada case on the general welfare powers of a municipality to regulate the conduct of businesses that impact the health and safety of residents.

Summary

The applicants, a lawn-care company, sought to overturn a municipal ban on pesticide use. They contended that the ban contravened or otherwise interfered with Quebec's Pesticides Act and federal Pest Control Products Act legislation, and sought a declaration that the municipality was ultra vires its power.  The Supreme Court ruled otherwise, as did the courts below. The appellants were taxed with costs.

See also

 CropLife v Toronto

References

Supreme Court of Canada cases
Canadian constitutional case law
2001 in Canadian case law
Environmental law in Canada
Local government in Canada
Local government in Quebec
Canadian biotechnology case law
Biotechnology in Canada